The Belgian Comic Strip Center is a museum in Brussels, Belgium, dedicated to Belgian comics. It is located at 20, /, in an Art Nouveau building designed by Victor Horta, and can be accessed from Brussels-Congress railway station and Brussels Central Station.

History of the building
The building was designed in 1905 by the world-famous architect Victor Horta, in Art Nouveau style, and served as a textile department store, the Magasins Waucquez. After Waucquez's death in 1920, the building began to languish away, and in 1970, the firm closed its doors. Jean Delhaye, a former aide of Horta, saved the building from demolition, and by 16 October 1975, it was designated as a protected monument. Still, the building was in bad shape and victim to a lot of vandalism.

In 1980, the architect Jean Breydel and the comics artists François Schuiten, Bob de Moor, Alain Baran, Guy Dessicy, and Hergé, planned to restore the building and give it a new destination as a museum dedicated to the history of Belgian comics. Originally, the museum would be a homage to Hergé, but he suggested honouring the entire Belgian comics industry. In 1983, Belgian Minister of Public Works, Louis Olivier, decided that the building would be bought by the Direction of Buildings, making it national property. In 1984, a fund was founded which brought together several Flemish and Walloon comics artists. Two years later, the restorations began, with respect for the original architecture, while updating it to modern standards. The mosaics were flown over from Italy and constructed by Italian mosaic workers, because the profession had become obsolete in Belgium.

On 6 October 1989, the museum was inaugurated in the presence of King Baudouin and Queen Fabiola.

In the Autumn of 2015, the museum started redecorating its permanent exhibition.

The museum
The ground floor of the museum holds a restaurant, a room dedicated to Victor Horta, a comics' store named "Slumberland" after Little Nemo in Slumberland, a library with a reading room and a study centre. The first floor has an auditorium, a room with original comic book pages by various artists and a room dedicated to animation, more specifically the Belgian animation industry, such as Belvision.

The second floor has a permanent exhibition dedicated to the chronological history of the medium in Belgium called "The Museum of Imagination". The exhibit starts off with Hergé and ends with Peyo, covering the pioneers of Belgian comics between 1929 and 1958 and with special focus on the magazines Spirou and Tintin. Each artist has a room dedicated to his work and designed in a playful way.

The final floor is dedicated to the merchandising of comics and available for provisional exhibitions.

List of the exhibited comics artists
Four artists exhibited are Flemish: Willy Vandersteen, Marc Sleen, Bob de Moor and Morris. The rest are Walloon or from Brussels, except for Jacques Martin and Tibet who were born in France, but published in Tintin.

 Hergé - (The Adventures of Tintin, Quick and Flupke, Jo, Zette and Jocko)
 Jijé - (Spirou et Fantasio, Jerry Spring)
 Edgar P. Jacobs - (Blake and Mortimer)
 Willy Vandersteen - (Suske en Wiske)
 Marc Sleen - (The Adventures of Nero)
 Maurice Tillieux - (Gil Jourdan)
 Bob De Moor - (Cori, de Scheepsjongen)
 André Franquin - (Spirou et Fantasio, Marsupilami, Gaston Lagaffe, Franquin's Last Laugh)
 Jacques Martin - (The Adventures of Alix)
 Morris - (Lucky Luke)
 Paul Cuvelier - (Corentin)
 Victor Hubinon - (Buck Danny)
 Tibet - (Chick Bill, Ric Hochet)
 Raymond Macherot - (Chlorophylle, Sybilline)
 Jean Roba - (Boule et Bill)
 Peyo - (Johan and Peewit, The Smurfs)

Marc Sleen Museum
Since 2009, directly across the Belgian comics museum, in the same street, another comics-themed museum can be found, the Marc Sleen Museum, dedicated to the work of Belgian comics artist Marc Sleen.

See also
 Brussels' Comic Book Route
 Art Nouveau in Brussels
 Culture of Belgium
 Belgium in "the long nineteenth century"

References

Notes

External links

 

Museums in Brussels
City of Brussels
Art museums and galleries in Belgium
Centre for Comic Strip Art
Cartooning museums
Tintin
Art museums established in 1989
1989 establishments in Belgium
Art Nouveau architecture in Brussels
Art Nouveau retail buildings
Art Nouveau museum buildings
Victor Horta buildings
Comics-related organizations